Wedding Season is a 2022 American romantic comedy film directed by Tom Dey from a screenplay by Shiwani Srivastava. The film stars Suraj Sharma, Pallavi Sharda, Rizwan Manji, Veena Sood, Ari Afsar, Sean Kleier, and Manoj Sood.

Wedding Season was released on August 4, 2022.

Plot

Asha is an economist working in microfinance who has recently broken off her engagement and left a Wall Street banking career behind to work for a microfinance startup in New Jersey. Asha's mother Suneeta, concerned for her future and against the advice of her husband Vijay, sets up a dating profile through which Asha meets Ravi. Though their first date goes badly, Asha eventually convinces Ravi to pretend that that they are dating at various weddings throughout the summer in order to ease the pressure to get married. Asha and Ravi slowly become interested in each other, and Asha learns that Ravi is secretly a wealthy DJ called DJ Spellbound.

Ravi encourages Asha when she needs to make sure the pitch goes successfully, and Asha is recruited for an executive position in London. Suneeta mistakes Asha's text to her sister Priya about the big news as news of her engagement to Ravi. The families plan a surprise lunch, during which Asha confesses their deception and Ravi admits that he dropped out of MIT and has no intention of getting a socially acceptable career. Ravi also admits to paying for catering orders from his father's restaurant in the name of his financial trust, the same trust that invested in Asha's pitch. Enraged, Asha ends their relationship. Later, Ravi argues with his parents about their disappointment in him.

Priya gets cold feet during her wedding. Asha encourages her, realizing in turn that she truly loves Ravi. She goes to his family's restaurant to see him with another woman, and gives a speech about what a great guy he is. Priya and Nick marry and introduce DJ Spellbound at the reception. Ravi and his parents reconcile, he admits his job to the community, and gets back together with Asha.

Cast
 Suraj Sharma as Ravi
 Pallavi Sharda as Asha
 Rizwan Manji as Vijay, Asha'a father
 Arianna Afsar as Priya
 Sean Kleier as Nick
 Veena Sood as Suneeta, Asha'a mother
 Manoj Sood as Dinesh, Ravi'a father
 Sonia Dhillon Tully as Veena
 Ruth Goodwin as Tina
 Damian Thompson as James
 Subhash Santosh as Darshit
 Julius Cho as Yoshi

Production
In 2018, Shiwani Srivastava's script, Wedding Season, placed in multiple screenwriting competitions, including the Academy Nicholl Fellowship, Final Draft's Big Break, and the ScreenCraft Comedy Competition. After winning the ScreenCraft Comedy Competition, the ScreenCraft team introduced her to an executive at Netflix, as well as her literary manager at Affirmative Entertainment. As a direct result of those introductions, Wedding Season was sold to Netflix.

In March 2021, was announced that Suraj Sharma and Pallavi Sharda would star in an upcoming romantic comedy film titled Wedding Season, written by Shiwani Srivastava and directed by Tom Dey for Netflix. Later the same month Rizwan Manji and Ari Afsar joined to the cast. On April 15, 2021 Sean Kleier also was set to star.

Principal photography began on April 19 and concluded on May 31, 2021, in Toronto, Canada. The film included outdoor and restaurant scenes shot in the Gerrard India Bazaar area of Toronto and the Lahore Tikka House restaurant.

Reception

References

External links
 

2022 films
2022 romantic comedy films
2020s American films
2020s English-language films
American romantic comedy films
English-language Netflix original films
Films about weddings in the United States
Films directed by Tom Dey
Films set in New Jersey
Films shot in Toronto
Imagine Entertainment films
Films about Indian Americans
Asian-American romance films
Comedy films about Asian Americans